Static (Virgil Ovid Hawkins) is a superhero appearing in American comic books published by DC Comics. The character was created by Milestone Comics founders Dwayne McDuffie, Denys Cowan, Michael Davis, and Derek T. Dingle, and first appeared in Static #1 (June 1993), written by McDuffie and Robert L. Washington III and illustrated by John Paul Leon. He is a member of a fictional subspecies of humans with superhuman abilities known as metahumans. Not born with his powers, Hawkins' abilities develop after an incident exposes him to a radioactive chemical called "Quantum Juice", turning him into a "Bang Baby" (a sub-category of metahuman).

The character drew much inspiration and was in fact designed to represent a modern-era Spider-Man archetype. After the closing of Milestone Comics, Static was incorporated into the DC Universe and became a member of the Teen Titans.

Static has made numerous appearances in other forms of media. The character has been featured in various animated series, including Static Shock, a version of the storyline made slightly more suitable for a younger audience, as well as animated films and video games.

Publication history

An African-American teenager, Static was a key character of Milestone Comics, an independently owned imprint of DC Comics founded by Dwayne McDuffie, Denys Cowan, Michael Davis, and Derek T. Dingle with a greater representation of minority heroes. Originally developed for Marvel Comics, Static would become a main staple of the Milestone line. When initially creating the first five characters for Milestone Comics, it was decided that Static should be a teenage hero, similar to Marvel's Spider-Man. Static's civilian identity, Virgil Hawkins, was named after Virgil D. Hawkins, a black man who was denied entrance to the University of Florida's law school due to his race in 1949. The character's superhero identity was suggested by writer Christopher Priest (who co-developed the original Milestone bible with McDuffie), inspired by the song "Static" by James Brown.

The character was introduced in one of the first four titles of comic books published by Milestone in 1993. His early adventures were written by Dwayne McDuffie and Robert L. Washington III, and penciled by John Paul Leon. Virgil Hawkins was fifteen years old when he became Static. In the comics, Virgil's family consists of his father, Robert, who works at Paris Island Hospital; his mother, Jean; and his sister, Sharon. Virgil attends Ernest Hemingway High School in the city of Dakota with his friends: Frieda Goren, Richard "Rick" Stone, Larry Wade, Chuck, Felix, and Daisy Watkins. In the guise of Static, Virgil eventually rescues "Rick Stone" from danger. Not unlike Spider-Man, the character has a propensity for witty banter and humor, especially when engaged with opponents. In addition, Virgil utilizes his knowledge of science and pop culture in various battles and scenarios as Static.

McDuffie described the character:"Like any other awkward 15-year-old, Virgil Hawkins worries about pocket money, getting beaten up, and drugs. But recently, he's had even more on his mind: stuff like his powers, his secret identity, and drugs.  Because, when innocents are in danger, and Virgil can slip away from class, the geeky youth becomes Static, the dashing, adventurous superhero!"

During the DC FanDome, according to Phil LaMarr, who voiced Static in the series Static Shock:

A self-professed geek, Virgil is portrayed as avid comic book and video game fan, something that was retained for his animated incarnation. In the comics, Virgil regularly visits the local comic store, in addition to creating fan comics with his friends, and participates in HeroClix-style and other tabletop role-playing games. In addition, he has been shown to be an avid video gamer at several points in both his series and the Teen Titans. In the 2001 miniseries Static Shock: Rebirth of the Cool, it is shown that at that point in time, Virgil is into collecting Pokémon cards and he likes Pikachu (the flagship Pokémon of the franchise and a fellow user of electricity).

In an interview, former Teen Titans writer Geoff Johns expressed interest in having Static as part of the team: "I really wanted Static on the team, but there’s so much red tape there that every time I requested it DC said 'not yet' and so I never got to have him" and later stating he had plans for the character since Teen Titans #1 (vol. 3). Any obstructions were eventually resolved and Static appeared in the Terror Titans, with his Milestone continuity folded in the mainstream New Earth continuity.

Static joined to the mainstream DC Universe where he would be added to the Teen Titans. Static made his first canonical DC Universe appearance in Terror Titans #4, battling Rose Wilson in the final round of the Dark Side Club Tournament.

Static was expected to receive his own series in 2011. The series was to be written by Felicia Henderson and drawn by Scott McDaniel, but was cancelled before the first issue could be released following the death of Static's creator, Dwayne McDuffie. However, a very limited one-shot titled Static Shock Special was released in June 2011, written by Henderson and drawn by Denys Cowan. Batwoman artist JH Williams III provided the one-shot's cover. A new series featuring Static titled Static Shock was launched in September 2011 as part of DC's relaunch after the Flashpoint event. The book is written by John Rozum and drawn by Scott McDaniel, who also co-wrote. As part of an effort to better integrate Static into the mainstream DCU, the title takes place in New York City rather than Dakota.

A new Static Shock digital comic series was released in February 2021.

Static: Season 1 
Hardcover released June 7, 2022 

Softcover released May 30, 2023

Fictional character biography

Dakota Verse

Doused with an experimental chemical in a gang war he was caught up in, high school student Virgil Ovid Hawkins gains a variety of electromagnetic powers and becomes a costumed crusader against crime. Like most teenaged heroes in the Spider-Man mold, he is often overwhelmed by the combined responsibilities of his career as a superhero and typical adolescent problems.

A resident of the city of Dakota, Virgil first gained his electromagnetic powers at a huge showdown between the gangs of the city, when he hoped to get revenge on a gang member who had been bullying him. The authorities arrive and release tear gas with what they believe to be a harmless radioactive marker so that any gang members would not escape arrest. The cops do not know the marker had been further spiked with an experimental mutagen called Quantum Juice (Q-Juice). This event ultimately came to be known as the so-called "Big Bang". Those who were exposed came to be referred to as "bang babies" because the Big Bang was their metahuman birth.

When the agency behind the experiment tried to capture him, he fights back, discovering that he has gained the ability to generate, manipulate, and control electromagnetism. Virgil names himself "Static" and, armed with his wits and powers, became a superhero. For the most part, Virgil keeps his secret from his family, but his friend, Frieda Goren, learns his identity when he attempts to protect her from becoming a prize in a small skirmish between gangs.

Virgil is aided by friends Rick Stone and Larry Wade. He shows romantic interest in his friend and confidante Frieda Goren, but she is involved with Larry Wade. He dates a girl named Daisy Watkins, but his 'responsibilities' as Static interfere with their dates too many times and Daisy calls their relationship off. In STATIC SHOCK: Rebirth of the Cool, Virgil is involved with a girl named Madison, but Frieda ends up fighting with her over him.

Static confronts numerous bang babies and other super powered adversaries: Hotstreak, Tarmack, Holocaust, Commando X, Puff, Coil, Snakefingers, Rift, The Swarm, Dr. Kilgore, Rubberband Man, Brat-atat-tat, Prometheus, Run, Jump & Burn, Boom Box, Powerfist, LaserJet, etc. Other Bang-Babies that Static has encountered include Virus, D-Struct and Hyacinth.

Static Shock: Rebirth of the Cool

In the mini-series Static Shock: Rebirth of the Cool it is revealed that Virgil has given up his superhero career as Static. He enjoys his time being a normal civilian again, but on occasion misses being a superhero where his friend and confidant Frieda gets him to begrudgingly admit.

Virgil eventually returns to his superhero persona after being persuaded by many of his fellow superheroes, including Blitzen and Hardware for one final battle.

After the final battle with a man named John Tower who is later revealed to have been the first and greatest superhero in the Milestone Universe, Virgil decides to fully return to his career as Static. Virgil then informs Frieda it likely won't be on a full-time basis as it was before.

Working with other heroes
Later in the comic line, Static is aided by allies: the Shadow Cabinet, the Blood Syndicate, and DCPD officer Captain Summers, who has a big interest in police cases involving Bang-Babies. Static teams up with Page, the sidekick to Kobalt, to stop a maddened Bang-Baby who had become half-fly. Static takes a moment to scold Page, who, in his opinion, seems more concerned with making excuses over their initial meet up than what was more important, stopping the danger.

Static ends up joining the unofficial group called Heroes. Multiple superheroes come together to protect the town of Iberia from a dam break. Many innocent citizens perish, but the heroes are still recognized for their efforts in saving the survivors and doing what they could. Static appears among the group, quips "You started the X-Men without me", and talks his way onto the team. Minutes later, the Shadow Cabinet, now corrupt, sends a death squad after a few of his newfound friends.

DC Universe
Following the death of Darkseid (as chronicled in Final Crisis), the space-time continuum was torn asunder, threatening the existence of both the Dakotaverse and the mainstream DC universe. The being known as Dharma was able to use energies that he harnessed from Rift (upon that being's defeat in Worlds Collide) to merge the two universes, creating an entirely new continuity. Only Dharma, Icon, and Superman are aware that Dakota and its inhabitants ever existed in a parallel universe.

Dark Side Club
In the buildup to the Final Crisis, the cosmic tyrant Darkseid hires the Terror Titans to capture Static, along with a number of the other Bang Babies in Dakota for use in the metahuman deathmatches in the Dark Side Club. During his tenure in captivity, Virgil is subjected to the Anti-Life Equation and entered into the tournaments, where he presumably kills a number of combatants. He quickly becomes the champion, and reigns undefeated for a time, though in the end, he proves hard to control. To Clock King's displeasure, he has to be restricted to the lower-levels where he is kept locked up and heavily sedated. In an attempt to entice Rose Wilson and make a profit, Clock King releases Static and sets him against Rose in the ring. In the ring, the two have an intense fight where Static's lightning-fast attacks are able to injure Rose, even despite her precognition. After a drawn-out fight, Static emerges the winner, but briefly breaks free of control before being sedated once more. Static is eventually freed by Rose (albeit off panel) and takes his revenge against his former captors, electrocuting Lashina and her cohorts as they try to escape. He also briefly duels with fellow electricity-wielder Dreadbolt, defeating and binding him in metal along with the other Terror Titans. In his final appearance he's seen joining up with Miss Martian and Aquagirl, planning their next move.

Joining the Teen Titans
After the Crisis has ended, Static and the other Dark Side Club survivors arrive at Titans Tower to rest. Wonder Girl, the current leader of the team, offers all of the young heroes spots on the team roster, but most of them, including Terra and Zachary Zatara, decline. While exploring the Tower, Virgil strikes up a chemistry with Aquagirl, a teenaged superheroine who was briefly a member of the team during 52. During a conversation with Virgil, she claims that she enjoyed her time with the team, and wishes to join up again, a statement that influences his decision to do the same. He also playfully insults Kid Devil and Jaime Reyes after they attempt to talk to him, mocking Kid Devil over his recent loss of his abilities. He claims that he was abducted by the Terror Titans months beforehand, and realizes that his family must believe him to be dead. Believing he has no place to go for the time being, Static decides to become a Titan and live at the Tower until he can get his life together.

Later, when crazed former-Titan Jericho (in the guise of Cyborg) takes control of the Tower and its systems in an attempt to kill the team, Static thwarts him by releasing a high-energy charge (an EMP), overloading the entire Tower, as well as Cyborg's body, saving the rest of the team in the process.

During a trip to the piers to relax, the Titans face off with the supervillain team known as the Fearsome Five, after they kidnap Wonder Girl and hold her hostage on Alcatraz Island. In the ensuing battle, Static defeats the villain known as Rumble by tricking him into moving into a pool of water, thus amplifying the effects of his electric attacks. In the aftermath of the battle, Virgil attends Kid Devil's funeral after he is killed saving the city from a nuclear explosion.

When former Titan Raven shows up at Titans Tower injured and unconscious, Static assists Justice Society of America member Dr. Mid-Nite in helping treat her, using his abilities to sedate Raven when a demon emerges from her body.

Brave and the Bold
In 2009 storyline it was recently revealed that prior to his abduction, Static teamed with Justice League member Black Lightning to stop former Blood Syndicate member Holocaust, who had tried to kill the superhero while he was acting as the keynote speaker at Ernest Hemingway High's senior graduation.

Return to Dakota
Virgil finally decides to see his family again after learning that a deadly virus has been infecting citizens of Dakota, including Sharon. After returning home, Virgil reunites with his family as well as Frieda, and learns that his girlfriend Madison has left him during his absence. He discovers that whoever created the virus is also selling limited supplies of the vaccine, and attacks the lab where it is being made. Upon breaking into the facility, Static is surprised and knocked out by Holocaust.

After refusing to help Holocaust in his pursuits, Static is imprisoned in a specialized containment unit alongside Aquagirl, Wonder Girl, and Bombshell. Holocaust informs the heroes that he plans to kill them and weaponize their abilities to sell them, but is ambushed by the rest of the Titans before this can happen. Holocaust easily defeats them, only to be confronted by Cyborg, who has recruited former Titans Kid Flash and Superboy.

The three are able to hold off Holocaust long enough for Virgil and the others to escape, and ultimately the combined might of all ten Teen Titans is enough to defeat the villain once and for all. After this, Virgil reconciles with Frieda and tells her that he has tricked his family into believing that he has taken part in a lengthy quantum physics fellowship, thus giving him an excuse to live in San Francisco with the rest of the Titans. He also makes one last attempt to win back Madison, but she silently rejects him. After this, Virgil and the other Titans decide to head home, now with Superboy and Kid Flash as members again.

After a mission to another dimension to rescue Raven, Virgil returns home to find that he no longer has his powers. Furious and scared over his situation, as well as his inability to help Miss Martian awaken from her coma, Virgil attempts to leave the Tower and return to Dakota. He is stopped by Cyborg, who tells Virgil that he will be of no help to anyone back home without his abilities, and tells him that he has arranged for Virgil to be taken to Cadmus Labs to find a way to get his powers back. Superboy offers to travel to Cadmus to support his friend, but Virgil tells him that the Titans need him now. Following a farewell breakfast, Static leaves for Cadmus, with Wonder Girl assuring him that he will always have a place on the team.

During the events of Flashpoint, Barry Allen accidentally alters history after a battle with Professor Zoom. In the newly created reality, Static is shown back in-costume with his powers restored.

The New 52

Following the reality-warping events of the 2011 Flashpoint storyline, Virgil and his family leave Dakota for New York after an unspecified tragic incident that, among other things, left his sister, Sharon, as two separate, identical entities. The vigilante Hardware gives Virgil a new costume and modified flying disk (made-up of 6 smaller, hexagonal-shaped-disks which can re-arrange formation), which enables the two to remain in contact despite living in different cities. Hardware also gives him an internship at S.T.A.R. Labs as an after school job; he has Virgil posing as a prodigy kid that he (in his civilian identity, Curtis Metcalf) had recruited from the Juvenile Court System, on a commuted sentence, as his cover-story. During his first major battle, Static defeats the villain, Sunspot, and earns the attention of a criminal syndicate known as the Slate Gang.

Static Shock was cancelled as of issue #8 as part of DC's "Second Wave" of The New 52 titles and replaced by an alternative title.

In Teen Titans, Virgil designed the cape and wing apparatus of Red Robin's new costume while at S.T.A.R.

Later, while recuperating at S.T.A.R. Labs from a previous battle, the Titans seek Virgil's help in curing Kid Flash, whose cells Virgil discovers are rapidly deteriorating as a result of an alteration of his powers. Virgil provides Kid Flash with a new costume (based on a personal sketch for a variant of the Flash's costume) containing materials that realign his molecules while stabilizing his powers, saving Kid Flash in the process.

2021 Milestone Returns

Milestone Returns created a new version of Static, combining ideas from previous Static comics and the Static Shock TV series. For example, Frieda Goren, Daisy Watkins, and Richie Foley all appear as friends of Virgil's. Richie is openly gay in the series, as the character he was based on, Rick Stone, was also gay and Richie's sexual orientation was never discussed in the TV series. 
 
Starting in Milestone Returns Issue #0, which takes place on Earth-M, 16-year-old Virgil Hawkins goes to a Black Lives Matter protest in the city of Dakota with his friends Frieda and Daisy, where the police use unstable, untested tear gas created by Alva Industries, inadvertently causing the "Big Bang" and granting several people metahuman powers. Curtis Metcalf, a long-time employee of Alva Industries, anticipates Alva will blame him for the incident and goes into hiding. Virgil is found unconscious after the Big Bang and wakes up in the hospital, being watched by his parents and sister. While he is physically unharmed, he stays home from school, getting used to controlling his new powers.

When he returns to school two weeks later, he sees the school bully Francis Stone, now calling himself "Hotstreak", harassing other students. Virgil uses his powers in front of other students to stop Hot-Streak, stopping well before an officer comes to intervene. When the officer comes to see what is going on, Hot-Streak says he slipped. Elsewhere in Dakota, a classmate of Virgil's, Darius, livestreams about the people who have transformed, being called Bang-Babies by the media. Meanwhile, a man named Holocaust starts building an army of metahumans.

In Static: Season One, the day after Virgil's fight with Hot-Streak, several students save for him and Virgil's friends believe someone else fought the bully. Seeking revenge, Hot-Streak attacks Virgil at his home, lighting it on fire. Virgil successfully keeps the damage to a minimum and defeats Hot-Streak once more, but his family develop concerns over his powers while he fears having to fight Hot-Streak again. Virgil contacts Metcalf, having met him previously during an "Inventors of Tomorrow" event, during which the latter informs him of a storage locker he owns. As Virgil explores the locker, the police arrive, believing him to be Metcalf. He dons a mask and suit, grabs as much items as he can carry, and escapes the police. Arriving home, Virgil modifies the suit.

After being captured by government armed forces and joining them in exchange for immunity, Hot-Streak helps them kidnap several Bang Babies. Virgil attempts to stop them, but is stopped by Darius. Hot-Streak and Agent Jones attempt to take Virgil from his home, but his parents bar the pair from entering. With the neighborhood watching, Hot-Streak and Jones are forced to leave empty-handed. As Virgil resolves to rescue the captured Bang Babies, Sharon provides him with glucose tablets so he can re-energize and an emergency line to her. With help from Darius, Frieda, and Ritchie, Virgil finds the facility containing the Bang Babies and takes the name Static.

Upon entering the facility, Virgil fights Hot-Streak, but is able to defend himself and restrain the latter. After Darius locates the Bang Babies, Virgil frees them, but a separate group of Bang Babies hired by the government attempt to stop the breakout. They attack Static, but he defeats them, convincing them that they need to work together. Sending forces to stop him, Jones uses an intercom to warn Virgil to surrender, but Richie discovers the location of Jones' servers, allowing Virgil to overload them while the others escape.

Days later, the Hawkins family reluctantly approve of Virgil becoming a superhero, with Sharon providing him with an updated suit. As the media attempt to spin a story about the Bang Babies attacking the government, Virgil hijacks the signals and tells the truth of what happened.

Powers and abilities

Static's powers allow him to control electromagnetic phenomena, in particular allowing him to manifest and manipulate both electrical and magnetic energy—Static's powers could be best described as superconductor electromagnetism; the latter is one of the four fundamental forces of the universe.

Static's powers center around electromagnetism, making him part of both the Earth's and the Sun's respective electromagnetic fields, as well as capable of generating, attracting, absorbing, repelling, channeling, storing, releasing, manipulating, and projecting electromagnetic energy. He can choose to keep the electromagnetic (EM) energy that he currently holds in his body by controlling the electric current's amperage and voltage for whenever and whatever he wants to use it for. Static's body can generate raw electromagnetic energy, in any form within the electromagnetic spectrum (i.e. regular EM energy into electrical energy, via the photovoltaic effect), which he can control at will for various purposes.

Static can also manipulate positive and negative electrical charges, on small or large scales; he once made use of this during a lightning storm, against Madelyn Spaulding in their second clash; she was foolishly levitating in the middle of an active thunderstorm when she was struck by lightning, as Static had given the surrounding scrap metal a large Positive Charge to attract the lightning, deliberately.

Such uses commonly include magnetizing objects (even able to stop speeding-bullets in mid-air), electrocuting opponents, levitating objects (such as manhole-covers or his self-built metal saucer for use in flight) and people, restraining or adhering people/objects to various surfaces in the form of "static cling", generating "taser punches-&-kicks"  (even "taser noogies") with effects similar to a stun gun and at times enough power to send opponents flying during close combat (once even punching a huge bang-baby made of molten magma through a brick wall), various electromagnetic displays as well as electromagnetic constructs, like nets or cages, blinding flashes, generating thrown "ball lightning", producing electromagnetic pulses to incapacitate electronical devices (especially when they're the main weapons used outnumbering enemies), and generating electromagnetic force fields (or assemble magnetized-metals into material barriers (see Electromagnetic induction)) to shield himself from attacks, even stopping bullets in mid-air. In the comic book series, Static has displayed the ability to manipulate subatomic particles, in particular electrons; in at least one instance, he has used this ability as an offensive attack to easily knockout a villain with the villain's own electrons, and in another instance, making an intangible enemy tangible. He can also electrocute nearby enemies.

As well as releasing surges of electromagnetic energy, which he can do from any part of his body, Static can also drain sources of electricity, such as power lines, batteries and fuse boxes to recharge/replenish his own energy supply. He has also displayed the ability to regenerate his powers after being completely drained by energy-draining villains. Whenever Static has used his powers to a high degree, or experience any other such large energy-drain, he will also experience a sudden, acute sense of fatigue, as his electromagnetic powers are tied into his own bioelectric energy levels. In the episode "Aftershock", in the 1st season of the animated series, an analysis of his blood shows that Static's electrolytes/blood-salt levels are higher-than-normal, highlighting that Static needs higher blood-salt levels to support the use of his powers, but the higher sodium levels seem to have no effect on his health. In the animated series, Static's powers may also be affecting him physically, à la electrical muscle stimulation (see also Transcutaneous electrical nerve stimulation), as, in seasons 1 & 2, Virgil/Static (aged 14/15-years-old) was quite skinny, where-as in seasons 3 & 4 (aged 15/16-years-old), he shows some defined muscles (this could be, either, a side-effect of his powers, OR just puberty).

Static can also sense and feel-out sources of electromagnetic energy, like an electromagnetic sensory perception ability, enabling him to tell if a seemingly-abandoned area is actually hot-or-not, and where there is metals (although it is, as-yet, unknown whenever-or-not Static is also capable of magnetoreception, like homing pigeons and sharks can (see also electrocommunication and magnetobiology)).

Static also has a kind of techno-kinetic ability, given that he can manipulate electrical signals within electronics. In the animated series, not-only could Virgil use his powers to turn-on a radio and his computer, and eavesdrop on phone-calls (Aftershock, season 1), without using any buttons, he could also use them to open program applications, such as the Internet and photoshop. He could also connect two electronic devices, a personal-stereo and a speaker, in-leu of a wire, to play-out a recorded confession (Child's Play, season 1). Static can use his powers to hear radio waves and tap into phone lines, including listening in on the police broadband and music stations, as well as making calls, and is also able to use his powers to mimic the uses of electronic devices such as a CD player (in "Aftershock", he also called himself a "human CD player" and even got "surround sound"), and is even able to use his powers to use an ordinary trashcan cover simultaneously as a shotgun microphone and a loudspeaker, or to eavesdrop on conversations through a vent. He can also cause electronical devices to explode.

It is notable that Static has more of a distinctive advantage in cities than anywhere-else, as shown in the events of "Aftershock", as even in a park, surrounded by trees, Static could make use of the metal pipelines under the ground with his magnetic powers.

In both the animated series and comic book, he is shown using his powers like an electric arc, creating plasma and to mimic that of a blowtorch or plasma torch, allowing him to cut and weld metal together.

In the animated series, Static's powers grant him resistance or immunity to forms of mind control, since the human brain is an electromagnetic organ. In "Attack of the Living Brain Puppets", Static (as speculated by Richie) is immune to Madelyn Spaulding's ability to hear the thoughts of others and exert control over their actions; Static's greater bioelectric field naturally shields him and his brainwaves from any attempts at reading his mind and asserting control over him, as also seen in the second part of "A League of Their Own", when one of Brainiac's mind-controlling devices shorts out within seconds of after having been placed on Static. This trait has also been adapted into the comic book mythos; within the comics, teammate Miss Martian has even been unable to track his where-abouts telepathically. In Terror Titans, Static is shown to have resistance to Darkseid's Anti-Life Equation, coming back to his senses.

Static has repeatedly displayed the ability to absorb and/or alter energy from enemy attacks and redirect the energy at said enemy, even radiation, as certain kinds of radiation are electromagnetic radiation (see the electromagnetic spectrum, Gamma rays, Microwaves, etc.); in Teen Titans, he has even absorbed Kryptonite radiation from a poisoned Superboy and redirected it at an enemy.  Static is able to use his powers to generate microwave energy to generate heat to combat ice attacks. He's also able to listen-in on radio waves, allowing him to listen to music, and even the police radio broadband; he can also use them to home-in on custom-made tracking-devices, made by Richie Foley/Gear.

Static can also manipulate air pressure within an enclosed space, as seen in Aftershock (season 1 of Static Shock), where he increased the air pressure inside of a chamber he'd been trapped within to escape. He can also empower gases, such as knockout gas, to make it more potent (Future Shock, season 4).

Static can use his powers in combination with items, like wire, assembled à la a cat's cradle, like the wire in filament in an Incandescent light bulb, to create powerful bursts of light, he calls "Nova Burst" (Bad Stretch, season 2), for the same tactical use like a flashbang grenade, to blind and disorientate opponents. Such a tactic is most effective against adversaries like Ebon (who is vulnerable to light), similar to his "Nova Ball" (Sons of the Fathers, season 1), and against most people (save for the blind), but less-so against opponents like Aqua-Maria (whose body is transparent, like water, allowing the light to pass right through her). When Virgil/Static introduces this trick, in the beginning of Bad Stretch (season 2), he dubs it his "Nova Burst" move. Static can also use his powers to bring usually-invisible energies (like a person's personal bioelectric energy aura) and bring them (at-least, temporarily) into visibility.

Virgil Hawkins is a highly gifted student with a particular interest in the sciences. He is a talented inventor and a natural strategist. Tim Drake has stated that Virgil's understanding of molecular and sub-atomic structures rivals the Flash's. According to the animated series, Virgil used to be an honors student before he got his powers, where-in his time as Static ate into his free time and, consequently, into his school grades.

Static's body has been shown to automatically heal itself, even from what would otherwise be lethal wounds, when drawing in large amounts of energy from a nearby energy source and energy to matter conversion.

Virgil also possesses an almost fanboyish knowledge of comic books, role playing games, pop culture, and science fiction.

In the animated series, Static's arsenal, over the course of the series, has included: his 'flying-disk' (which Richie dubbed the "Static Saucer"), a disk made of mylar foil which Static can use to fly, via electromagnetic-levitation, and can easily fold-up when not in-use. His "Shock-Vox", a hand-made walkie-talkie he and Richie had made, originally, as their science-lad project, and then later kept for use in their 'extracurricular activities'. "Zap-Caps" (1.0), originally made by Richie for Static as a back-up, in case he was ever low-on-power and needed buy time to recharge (instead, Static made use of them to recharge-outright by re-absorbing the charge he'd originally given them). His 'tracking device', first made by Richie in "Bad Stretch", transmits on a high-band frequency with a radius of two miles; Static can hear it in his ears with his powers, just like he can hear radio-waves and the police broadband, and in the episode "Linked", Richie also mentions that Back-Pack is capable of tracing these devices. In the episode "Gear", Richie mentions that he has increased the range on the tracking device, and has incorporated a similar function into their 'Shock-Voxes'.

Following the events of "Flashpoint", Static is given a new flying disk that now contains a holographic interface and is capable of collapsing into separate pieces or re-configuring into various forms for various uses and applications. In addition to allowing Static to remain in contact with Hardware, the disk also displays charts and other information relevant to the mission at hand. Virgil has also begun using a three-piece, detachable Bō-staff, both activated-by—and used in conjunction with—his powers, for use in close-ranged fighting.

Weaknesses
Static's primary weaknesses are insulators; wood, cloth, rubber, glass, fibreglass, plastics and ceramics, etc., as his powers have little or no effect on them, as shown in his battle with Rubberband-Man. Wood seems to be the one he has the most difficulty with, as it cannot be electromagnetically manipulated, levitated or damaged (though Static can use his powers to ignite wood and cloth, and to melt glass and plastic, etc.). This can, however, be gotten-around if objects (metals, etc.) that he can manipulate are available (i.e. while wood-itself doesn't conduct electricity, if a piece of wood has a metal nail embedded in it, he can levitate it, via the metal nail), and certain materials, while they may not, themselves, be conductors of electricity and electromagnetism, are subjectable to static electricity (i.e. plastics).  Also, in They're Playing My Song (season 1 of the Static Shock animated series), Static demonstrates that "a big-enough charge can overload any insulator", although doing-so was very draining (especially while still so-new to his powers).

As mentioned above, his electromagnetic powers are tied into his own bioelectric energy levels; whenever Static has used his powers to a high degree, or experience any other such large energy-drain, he will also experience a sudden, acute sense of fatigue and must re-charge from a pre-existing source of electricity to supplement his depleted energy levels if he cannot have the time to restore them through rest.

Also as mentioned above, Static's powers centre around electromagnetism, making him part of, both, the Earth's and the Sun's respective electromagnetic fields; like Superman, Static's powers can be interfered-with by over-active solar activity, as seen in Sunspots (episode 6, season 2).

In the animated series, Static has a vulnerability to water, if he's powered-up at the time (when his powers are in active use to a high-enough degree, as-opposed to small-scale use), which (as water is a conductor of electricity, if minerals are dissolved in it), if he gets taken and drenched by surprise, shorts out his powers until he can dry off and replenish them. However, he can fly in the rain without short-circuiting, most-likely because it's pure water, lacking any/enough dissolved conductive minerals within it. This weakness only applies in the animated series, as Static has never shown a weakness to water in the comics and has even used it to his advantage. In the animated series, Virgil did use the relationship between his powers and water a few times for advantages, like against the water Bang Baby, Aqua-Maria, as he blasted the wet floor full of electricity (electrolysis of water), knocking a few of his enemies out. He has also hit the ocean to stop boats.

Static can be shocked by electricity, if he's taken by surprise, before he's prepared to absorb said-electrical attack; this was seen in The New Kid (season 1), and Hard as Nails and She-Bang (season 3). Likewise with electrical charges with alternated electrical frequencies before he's prepared.

Static's unique electromagnetic energy-signature can be used against him as a means of tracking him, as shown in The New Kid, in season 1 of the animated series, where antagonists, Specs and Trapper, use a robotic drone, dubbed "The Alva Machine", outfitted with an electronic eye capable of tracking Static by his electromagnetic power's unique energy-signature. Also, Static can be identified by others with powers like his, as Morris Grant (a.k.a. Soul-Power), a retired superhero with electrical powers of his-own, had known upon first meeting him that Virgil Hawkins was Static (but hadn't said anything until his old arch-nemesis, Professor Menace, resurfaced after an absence of decades).

Technology, specifically designed to absorb and fire-back direct electrical attacks, can also pose a problem to Static, if he attacks them directly (Blast From The Past, season 3); however, he can get-around this with indirect-attacks, i.e. taking-out the ground beneath them, using physical objects to hit them and restrain them.

Static's powers (or, at-least, when they're in active-use) react with the air (ionising oxygen molecules) in such a way as to make him detectable to individuals with sensitive-enough senses of smell, such as Ferret, as-seen-in The Big Leagues (season 2).

In the animated series, Static's own cockiness, on-occasion, did directly result in him getting hit by attacks that he would have, otherwise, dodged if he'd been paying proper attention.

Supporting characters

Static has a number of supporting characters, from best friends Rick Stone, Larry Wade, and Frieda Goren to sometime love interest Daisy Watkins.

Other versions

Milestone Forever
Static appears as a major character in the 2010 limited series Milestone Forever, a project designed to detail the final fates of the Milestone launch characters prior to being assimilated into DC's continuity. In Static's tale, Virgil is attending his ten year high school reunion, and has given up his life of crime-fighting and is now pursuing a career in medicine. Rick (now going by his television moniker of "Richie") is also now working as a director in Los Angeles, and is open about his homosexuality. Without warning, Hotstreak (recently released from prison and now calling himself Firewheel), attacks the reunion, exclaiming that he now realizes that Static must have been one of his old classmates. Virgil briefly takes up the Static mantle again for one last fight with his old nemesis, and eventually defeats him. During this time, it is also revealed that Sharon is now married and pregnant, and that Robert has died. Rocket is implied to have taken over as the new Icon.

The story then skips ahead another ten years to show that Virgil is now married to Frieda and has two children, Larry and Sadie (both of whom have inherited his electrical abilities), and now works as a doctor. The story ends with the couple reflecting on their life, and Virgil playfully asking Frieda if she wants him to return to his role as Static. She simply smiles and tells him "absolutely not" and the two passionately kiss.

In other media

Television
 Static appears in series set in the DC Animated Universe (DCAU), voiced by Phil LaMarr:
 Static first appears as the titular protagonist of Static Shock. This version is a fourteen-year-old honors student at Dakota Union High School who lives with his widowed father and social worker, Robert Hawkins, and his sister Sharon Hawkins, a university student and counselor at the Freeman Community Center. Additionally, Virgil's mother, paramedic Jean Hawkins, was killed five years prior to the series during the Dakota Riots. Similar to the comics, Virgil gains his powers while reluctantly taking part in a gang war and getting caught in an explosion caused by mutagenic gas called "Quantum Vapor" in an event that would later be dubbed the "Big Bang" by the media. Everyone exposed to the gas gained powers and became known as "Bang Babies", with Virgil gaining electromagnetic powers and going on to become Static to battle villainous Bang Babies.
 An adult Static appears in the Static Shock episode "Future Shock" and the Justice League Unlimited episode "The Once and Future Thing, Part 2: Time, Warped". As of the future setting of preceding DCAU series Batman Beyond, he has joined and become an active member of the Justice League.
 Static appears in Young Justice, voiced by Bryton James. This version is one of several teens who were abducted and experimented on by the Reach, through which he acquired his powers after they activated his latent meta-gene. After being rescued by the Team, he and three other abductees are transferred to S.T.A.R. Labs' custody, but they escape and are later recruited by Lex Luthor to help the Light combat the Reach until Arsenal tells them the truth about Luthor. After working with Black Lightning to thwart the Reach's invasion of Earth, Static studies under his tutelage and joins the Team. Two years later, during Young Justice: Outsiders, Static has honed his powers further with Black Lightning's help before going on to join the Outsiders.
 A live-action Static Shock program by Warner Bros. from Reginald Hudlin was to be developed as part of the company's new Blue Ribbon Content digital division, and were eyeing Jaden Smith for the title role. Actor Tyler James Williams said in an interview that Jaden Smith was cast as Static, but this has yet to be confirmed by Blue Ribbon Content or by Warner Bros. As of 2021, there have not been any updates on the series and it is unknown if is still in development due to the progression of the film adaptation (see below).

Film
 Virgil Hawkins makes a non-speaking cameo appearance in Justice League: War. This version's appearance is similar to his Young Justice counterpart.
 At DC FanDome held in August 2020, a live-action Static Shock film was revealed to be in development. The project will be a collaboration between DC Films, Warner Bros. Pictures, and Milestone Media. By October of the same year, Michael B. Jordan joined the production team as co-producer alongside Reginald Hudlin. Jordan's company, Outlier Society, will serve as one of the production studios and Randy McKinnon was picked to write the film in March 2021. 
 An animated film about Static and other Milestone heroes is currently in development at Warner Animation Group.

Video games

 In May 2003, Midway Games announced the production of a platformer Static Shock video game for the Game Boy Advance. While the game was displayed at the Electronic Entertainment Expo, it was later cancelled. 
 Static appears in DC Universe Online as part of the Lightning Strikes DLC. This version is a member of the Teen Titans.
 Static appears as a downloadable playable character in the mobile version of Injustice: Gods Among Us.
 Static was set to appear as a playable character in Injustice 2, but was cut from the game.

Motorsport
In 2022, DC Comics, Milestone Media, and Warner Bros. Discovery partnered with Ally Financial and NASCAR to debut a sponsorship and new Static-based paint scheme for Alex Bowman's No. 48 Chevrolet Camaro ZL1 1LE for Hendrick Motorsports, in support of DC's The Milestone Initiative program.

References

External links
 Official DC Comics profile
 Official DC Universe profile
 Get to Know! Static - DC Universe
 Static at International Hero
 Static at Don Markstein's Toonopedia. Archived from the original on December 7, 2017.
 Unofficial Guide to DC Comics entry
 Titans Tower biography
 
 Official DCComics.com Static Shock profile
 WB Static Shock Static Shock WB Homepage
 Static Shock Animated Series Synopsis Page on TV.com about Static Shock

Comics characters introduced in 1993
Characters created by Dwayne McDuffie
Black characters in animation
Black people in comics
Black people in television
Milestone Comics titles
DC Comics American superheroes
DC Comics male superheroes
DC Comics metahumans
DC Comics scientists
DC Comics characters with accelerated healing
DC Comics titles
African-American superheroes
Fictional characters with elemental transmutation abilities
Fictional characters with superhuman senses
Fictional characters with absorption or parasitic abilities
Fictional characters with electric or magnetic abilities
Fictional characters with gravity abilities
Fictional characters with metal abilities
Fictional high school students
Fictional inventors
Fictional technopaths
Male characters in animation
Static Shock characters
Teenage characters in comics
Teenage superheroes
Vigilante characters in comics